The 1937 Campbell Trophy (formally known as I Campbell Trophy) was a Grand Prix that was held on 1 May 1937 at Brooklands near Weybridge, United Kingdom. It was the fourth round of the 1937 Grand Prix season, but it did not count towards the championship. The race, contested over 100 laps of 3.65 km, was won in the Class over 1500cc by Prince Bira, the only non-British driver in this event, driving a Maserati 8CM after starting from fourth position on the grid. The victory in the 1500cc Class was taken by Teddy Rayson, driving a Maserati 4C.

Entries

Qualifying results

 Drivers shown in cursive drove in the 1500cc class.

Race report
At the start of the race, Aitken stalled his Maserati, so it was pushed away to be started elsewhere. After just one lap, Bira had taken the lead followed by Howe and Walker. However, Walker's engine stopped and, after eight laps, his gearbox broke, so he retired. Likewise did Mays (brake problems) and Dodson (overheated engine).

Bira kept the lead until Howe, who celebrated his fifty-third birthday on this day, overtook him in the nineteenth lap. However, six laps later Howe hit an earth bank on the Vickers bridge and the front of the car hit the palisade. The car then bounced to the other side of the track and ended up on its right side. Howe suffered injuries on the head, arm, shoulder and ribs.

At this point Bira was again first, with Austin Dobson and Rayson behind him, until  Dobson's clutch broke in the thirty-first lap. Staniland fell back due to brake problems, as did Arthur Dobson, who had a cup of tea while his mechanics changed the front brake shoes on his ERA. He eventually retired. As for drivers changes, during the fuel stops Jack Duller took over from Ashby, Mays switched seats with Fairfield, as did Fleming with Wilkinson and Hamilton went on in De Belleroche's car.

After eighty laps eleven drivers had retired. Among the last was Evans who had to park his Alta at Hill Bend without brakes and with broken transmission. Bira eventually won the race over two and a half minutes in front of Rayson, who took victory in the voiturette 1500cc class, and Powys-Lybbbe became third.

Race results

 Drivers shown in cursive drove in the 1500cc class.

Sources
 The Golden Era of Grand Prix Racing - 1937 Campbell Trophy (Archived 2013-07-13)
 Racing Sports Cars - Drivers. The page of each of the aforementioned drivers was consulted. (Archived 2013-07-13)
 The Golden Era of Grand Prix Racing - Drivers. The page of each of the aforementioned drivers was consulted.

1937 in motorsport
1937 in British motorsport
1937 in English sport
Motorsport competitions in the United Kingdom